The following is an alphabetical list of members of the United States House of Representatives from the state of Montana.  For chronological tables of members of both houses of the United States Congress from the state (through the present day), see United States congressional delegations from Montana.  The list of names should be complete (as of May 25, 2017), but other data may be incomplete. It includes members who have represented both the state and the territory, both past and present.

Current members

Updated January 2023.

 : Ryan Zinke (R) (since 2023, 2015–2017)
 : Matt Rosendale (R) (since 2021)

List of members and delegates

See also

List of United States senators from Montana
United States congressional delegations from Montana
Montana's congressional districts

References

External links
House of Representatives List of Members

 
Montana
United States representatives